Events from the year 1192 in Ireland.

Incumbent
Lord: John

Events

St Patrick’s Cathedral built in Dublin.

Births

Deaths

References